Eusebio Mesa (born 23 September 1939) is a Spanish boxer. He competed in the men's flyweight event at the 1960 Summer Olympics.

References

1939 births
Living people
Spanish male boxers
Olympic boxers of Spain
Boxers at the 1960 Summer Olympics
Sportspeople from Las Palmas
Flyweight boxers
20th-century Spanish people